The 2019 Vuelta a Murcia was the 39th edition of the Vuelta a Murcia cycle race. It was from 15-16 February 2018 as a UCI Europe Tour category 2.1 race. The race was won by Luis León Sánchez of the  team.

Teams
Eighteen teams of up to seven riders started the race:

Route

Stages

Stage 1

Stage 2

Final classification standings

References

2019
2019 UCI Europe Tour
2019 in Spanish road cycling